Prijović is a Serbian surname. Notable people with the surname include:

Aleksandar Prijović (born 1990), Serbian footballer
Ivana Prijović (born 1992), Serbian handball player 

Serbian surnames
Slavic-language surnames
Patronymic surnames